Parazoanthus is a genus of anemone-like anthozoans in the order Zoantharia.

Species
The following species are recognized in the genus Parazoanthus:
 Parazoanthus aliceae Carreiro-Silva, Ocaña, Stanković, Sampaio, Porteiro, Fabri & Stefanni, 2017
 Parazoanthus anguicomus (Norman, 1868)
 Parazoanthus antarcticus Carlgren, 1927
 Parazoanthus aruensis Pax, 1911
 Parazoanthus axinellae (Schmidt, 1862)
 Parazoanthus capensis Carlgren, 1938
 Parazoanthus darwini Reimer & Fujii, 2010
 Parazoanthus dichroicus Haddon A.C. & Shackleton A.M. 1891
 Parazoanthus douglasi Haddon & Shackleton, 1891
 Parazoanthus elongatus McMurrich, 1904
 Parazoanthus haddoni Carlgren, 1913
 Parazoanthus juan-fernandezii Carlgren, 1922
 Parazoanthus lividum Cutress, 1971
 Parazoanthus swiftii (Duchassaing & Michelotti, 1860)

References

 
Parazoanthidae
Bioluminescent cnidarians
Hexacorallia genera